Aphelodoris affinis is a species of sea slug, a dorid nudibranch, shell-less marine gastropod mollusks in the family Dorididae.

References

Dorididae
Gastropods described in 1907